The following outline is provided as an overview of and topical guide to Sweden:

Sweden – Scandinavian country in Northern Europe, situated between Norway and Finland.  Sweden has maintained a policy of neutrality in armed conflicts since the early 19th century. It is a member of the European Union, but retains its own currency (the krona). Swedish icons include Sweden's quality of life, its neutrality, public health care, cars (Volvo, Saab), furniture (IKEA), blonds and pop music performers (ABBA, Roxette, etc.).

General reference 

 Pronunciation (in English): 
 Common English country name:  Sweden
 Official English country name:  Kingdom of Sweden
 Common endonym(s): Sverige
 Official endonym(s): Konungariket Sverige
 Adjectival(s): Swedish
 Demonym(s): Swedish, Swedes
 Etymology: Name of Sweden
 International rankings of Sweden
 ISO country codes:  SE, SWE, 752
 ISO region codes:  See ISO 3166-2:SE
 Internet country code top-level domain:  .se

Geography of Sweden 

Geography of Sweden
 Sweden is: a Nordic country
 Location:
 The regions that Sweden is located in are:
 Northern Hemisphere and Eastern Hemisphere
 Eurasia
 Europe
 Northern Europe
 Scandinavia
 Scandinavian Peninsula
 Time zone:  Central European Time (UTC+01), Central European Summer Time (UTC+02)
 Extreme points of Sweden
 High:  Kebnekaise 
 Low:  Kristianstad 
 Land boundaries:  2,233 km
 1,619 km
 614 km
 Coastline:  3,218 km
 Population of Sweden: 10,065,389 (July 31, 2017)  - 89th most populous country

 Area of Sweden: 449,964 km2
 Atlas of Sweden

Environment of Sweden 

 Climate of Sweden
 Climate change in Sweden
 Renewable energy in Sweden
 Geology of Sweden
 Protected areas of Sweden
 Biosphere reserves in Sweden
 National parks of Sweden
 Wildlife of Sweden
 Fauna of Sweden
 Amphibians and reptiles of Sweden
 Birds of Sweden
 Fish in Sweden
 Insects of Sweden
 Ants of Sweden
 Butterflies of Sweden
 Moths of Sweden
 Mammals of Sweden
 Molluscs of Sweden
 Flora of Sweden
 List of lichens of Sweden

Natural geographic features of Sweden 

 Forests of Sweden
 Islands of Sweden
 Lakes of Sweden
 Mountains of Sweden
 Glaciers of Sweden
 Rivers of Sweden
 World Heritage Sites in Sweden

Regions of Sweden 

Regions of Sweden

Ecoregions of Sweden 

List of ecoregions in Sweden
 Ecoregions in Sweden

Administrative divisions of Sweden 

Administrative divisions of Sweden
 Counties of Sweden – first-level administrative and political subdivisions of Sweden, of which there are 21.
 Municipalities of Sweden – Sweden's lower-level local government entities, of which there are 290.
 Districts of Sweden – municipalities in Sweden are in some rare cases divided into smaller districts.
 Provinces of Sweden – 25 historical, geographical or cultural regions that have no administrative function, but remain historical legacies and the means of cultural identification.

Counties of Sweden 

Counties of Sweden
 Stockholm County
 Västerbotten County
 Norrbotten County
 Uppsala County
 Södermanland County
 Östergötland County
 Jönköping County
 Kronoberg County
 Kalmar County
 Gotland County
 Blekinge County
 Skåne County
 Halland County
 Västra Götaland County
 Värmland County
 Örebro County
 Västmanland County
 Dalarna County
 Gävleborg County
 Västernorrland County
 Jämtland County

Municipalities of Sweden 

Municipalities of Sweden
 Capital of Sweden: Stockholm
 Cities of Sweden

Provinces of Sweden 

Provinces of Sweden
The provinces of Sweden, which are primarily historical in significance, are:

Blekinge
Bohuslän
Dalarna (Dalecarlia*)
Dalsland
Gotland (Gotlandia*)
Gästrikland
Halland
Hälsingland
Härjedalen
Jämtland
Lappland
Medelpad
Norrbotten
Närke (Nerike*)
Skåne (Scania*)
Småland
Södermanland
Uppland
Värmland
Västmanland
Västerbotten
Västergötland
Ångermanland
Öland
Östergötland

Demography of Sweden 

Demographics of Sweden
 Census of Sweden
 Demographical center of Sweden

Government and politics of Sweden 

Politics of Sweden
 Form of government: Constitutional monarchy
 Capital of Sweden: Stockholm
 Arctic policy of Sweden
 Anarchism in Sweden
 Consolidation of Sweden
 Corruption in Sweden
 Elections in Sweden
 Election Authority of Sweden
 :Category:Elections in Sweden
 Monetary policy of Sweden
 Political parties in Sweden
 Taxation in Sweden
 Terrorism in Sweden

Branches of the State 
 Head of state: King of Sweden, Carl XVI Gustaf

Executive branch 
 Head of government: Prime Minister of Sweden
 Deputy Prime Minister of Sweden
 Government of Sweden
 Government Agencies in Sweden

Legislative branch 
 Riksdag of Sweden (unicameral)
 Speaker of the Riksdag
 Members of the Riksdag 
 Parliamentary committees
 Committee on Civil Affairs (Parliament of Sweden)
 Committee on Finance (parliament of Sweden)
 Committee on Foreign Affairs (parliament of Sweden)
 Committee on Justice (parliament of Sweden)
 Committee on the Constitution (Parliament of Sweden)

Judicial branch 

Judicial system of Sweden
 Supreme Court of Sweden
 Supreme Administrative Court of Sweden

Foreign relations of Sweden 

Foreign relations of Sweden
 Diplomatic missions in Sweden
 Diplomatic missions of Sweden
 Embassy of Sweden in Moscow
 Embassy of Sweden, Athens
 Embassy of Sweden, Bangkok
 Embassy of Sweden, Helsinki
 Embassy of Sweden, London
 List of ambassadors of Sweden to the United Kingdom
 Embassy of Sweden, Mexico City
 Embassy of Sweden, Paris
 Embassy of Sweden, Prague
 Embassy of Sweden, Rome
 List of ambassadors of Sweden to Germany
 List of ambassadors of Sweden to Ukraine
 List of ambassadors of Sweden to the United States

International organization membership 
The Kingdom of Sweden is a member of:

African Development Bank Group (AfDB) (nonregional member)
Arctic Council
Asian Development Bank (ADB) (nonregional member)
Australia Group
Bank for International Settlements (BIS)
Confederation of European Paper Industries (CEPI)
Council of Europe (CE)
Council of the Baltic Sea States (CBSS)
Euro-Atlantic Partnership Council (EAPC)
European Bank for Reconstruction and Development (EBRD)
European Investment Bank (EIB)
European Organization for Nuclear Research (CERN)
European Space Agency (ESA)
European Union (EU)
Food and Agriculture Organization (FAO)
Group of 9 (G9)
Group of Ten (G10)
Inter-American Development Bank (IADB)
International Atomic Energy Agency (IAEA)
International Bank for Reconstruction and Development (IBRD)
International Chamber of Commerce (ICC)
International Civil Aviation Organization (ICAO)
International Criminal Court (ICCt)
International Criminal Police Organization (Interpol)
International Development Association (IDA)
International Energy Agency (IEA)
International Federation of Red Cross and Red Crescent Societies (IFRCS)
International Finance Corporation (IFC)
International Fund for Agricultural Development (IFAD)
International Hydrographic Organization (IHO)
International Labour Organization (ILO)
International Maritime Organization (IMO)
International Mobile Satellite Organization (IMSO)
International Monetary Fund (IMF)
International Olympic Committee (IOC)
International Organization for Migration (IOM)
International Organization for Standardization (ISO)
International Red Cross and Red Crescent Movement (ICRM)
International Telecommunication Union (ITU)
International Telecommunications Satellite Organization (ITSO)

International Trade Union Confederation (ITUC)
Inter-Parliamentary Union (IPU)
Multilateral Investment Guarantee Agency (MIGA)
Nonaligned Movement (NAM) (guest)
Nordic Council (NC)
Nordic Investment Bank (NIB)
Nuclear Energy Agency (NEA)
Nuclear Suppliers Group (NSG)
Organisation for Economic Co-operation and Development (OECD)
Organization for Security and Cooperation in Europe (OSCE)
Organisation for the Prohibition of Chemical Weapons (OPCW)
Organization of American States (OAS) (observer)
Paris Club
Partnership for Peace (PFP)
Permanent Court of Arbitration (PCA)
Schengen Convention
United Nations (UN)
United Nations Conference on Trade and Development (UNCTAD)
United Nations Educational, Scientific, and Cultural Organization (UNESCO)
United Nations High Commissioner for Refugees (UNHCR)
United Nations Industrial Development Organization (UNIDO)
United Nations Military Observer Group in India and Pakistan (UNMOGIP)
United Nations Mission in Liberia (UNMIL)
United Nations Mission in the Central African Republic and Chad (MINURCAT)
United Nations Mission in the Sudan (UNMIS)
United Nations Observer Mission in Georgia (UNOMIG)
United Nations Organization Mission in the Democratic Republic of the Congo (MONUC)
United Nations Relief and Works Agency for Palestine Refugees in the Near East (UNRWA)
United Nations Truce Supervision Organization (UNTSO)
Universal Postal Union (UPU)
Western European Union (WEU) (observer)
World Customs Organization (WCO)
World Federation of Trade Unions (WFTU)
World Health Organization (WHO)
World Intellectual Property Organization (WIPO)
World Meteorological Organization (WMO)
World Trade Organization (WTO)
World Veterans Federation
Zangger Committee (ZC)

Law and order in Sweden 

Law of Sweden
 Constitution of Sweden
 Divorce law in Sweden
 Human rights in Sweden
 Abortion in Sweden
 Censorship in Sweden
 Compulsory sterilisation in Sweden
 LGBT rights in Sweden
 Same-sex marriage in Sweden
 Freedom of religion in Sweden
 Law enforcement in Sweden
 Crime in Sweden
 Human trafficking in Sweden
 Racism in Sweden
 Antisemitism in Sweden
 Terrorism in Sweden
 Capital punishment in Sweden
 Life imprisonment in Sweden

Military of Sweden 

Military of Sweden
 Command
 Commander-in-chief: Government of Sweden (Prime Minister, Minister for Defence)
 Supreme Commander of the Swedish Armed Forces
 Ministry of Defence of Sweden 
 Forces
 Swedish Armed Forces
 Swedish Army
 Swedish Home Guard
 Swedish Navy
Swedish Amphibious Corps
Swedish Fleet
 Swedish Air Force
 Military aircraft of Sweden
 Special forces of Sweden
 Military equipment of Sweden
 Military history of Sweden
 Military ranks of Sweden
 Soldier ranks of Sweden

Local government in Sweden 

Local government in Sweden
 County Administrative Boards of Sweden
 County councils of Sweden
 Municipalities of Sweden

History of Sweden 

History of Sweden
 Timeline of the history of Sweden
 Current events of Sweden

History of Sweden, by period 
 History of Sweden (800–1521)
 History of Sweden (1523–1611)
 History of Sweden (1611–48)
 History of Sweden (1772–1809)
 History of Sweden (1945–67)
 History of Sweden (1967–91)
 History of Sweden (1991–present)

History of Sweden, by region

History of Sweden, by subject 
 Economic history of Sweden
 History of the Internet in Sweden
 History of the Jews in Sweden
 History of rail transport in Sweden
 Military history of Sweden

Culture of Sweden 

Culture of Sweden
 Architecture of Sweden
 Historic buildings in Sweden
 Crown palaces in Sweden
 Castles and manor houses in Sweden
 Cathedrals in Sweden
 Cuisine of Sweden
 Alcoholic beverages in Sweden
 Beer in Sweden
 Beer classification in Sweden and Finland
 Festivals in Sweden
 Linguistics of Sweden
 Date and time notation in Sweden
 Languages of Sweden
 Media in Sweden
 Museums in Sweden
 National symbols of Sweden
 Coat of arms of Sweden
 Flag of Sweden
 National anthem of Sweden
 Prostitution in Sweden
 Public holidays in Sweden
 Records of Sweden
 Scouting and Guiding in Sweden
 World Heritage Sites in Sweden

Art in Sweden 
 Art in Sweden
 Cinema of Sweden
 Literature of Sweden
 Music of Sweden
 Television in Sweden
 Theatre in Sweden

People of Sweden 
People of Sweden
 Ethnic minorities in Sweden
 Albanians in Sweden
 Arabs in Sweden
 Armenians in Sweden
 Assyrians in Sweden
 Assyrians/Syriacs in Sweden
 Croats of Sweden
 Ethnic Macedonians in Sweden
 Sweden Finns
 Kurds in Sweden
 Lebanese people in Sweden
 Pakistanis in Sweden
 Russians in Sweden
 Somalis in Sweden
 Turks in Sweden
 Uruguayans in Sweden

Religion in Sweden 
Religion in Sweden
 Buddhism in Sweden
 Christianity in Sweden
 Baptist Union of Sweden
 Church of Sweden
 Church of Sweden Abroad
 Archdiocese of Uppsala
 Evangelical Free Church in Sweden
 Evangelical Lutheran Church in Sweden
 Evangelical Reformed Church in Sweden
 Roman Catholicism in Sweden
 Hinduism in Sweden
 Islam in Sweden
 Ahmadiyya in Sweden
 Judaism in Sweden
 Sikhism in Sweden

Sports in Sweden 

Sports in Sweden
 Football in Sweden
 Australian rules football in Sweden
 Football derbies in Sweden
 Football records in Sweden
 Women's football in Sweden
 Sweden at the Olympics
 Rugby league in Sweden
 Rugby union in Sweden
 Speedway in Sweden
 Speedway Grand Prix of Sweden
 1995 Speedway Grand Prix of Sweden
 1996 Speedway Grand Prix of Sweden
 1997 Speedway Grand Prix of Sweden
 1998 Speedway Grand Prix of Sweden
 1999 Speedway Grand Prix of Sweden
 2000 Speedway Grand Prix of Sweden
 2007 Speedway Grand Prix of Sweden
 2008 Speedway Grand Prix of Sweden
 2009 Speedway Grand Prix of Sweden
 2010 Speedway Grand Prix of Sweden
 2011 Speedway Grand Prix of Sweden
 2012 Speedway Grand Prix of Sweden
 Strength athletics in Sweden
 Women's ice hockey in Sweden
 Swimming in Sweden

Economy and infrastructure of Sweden 

Economy of Sweden
 Economic rank, by nominal GDP (2007): 18th (eighteenth)
 Agriculture in Sweden
 Automotive industry in Sweden
 Banking in Sweden
 Monetary policy of Sweden
 Banks in Sweden
 Swedish National Bank
 Student loans in Sweden
 Communications in Sweden
 Telecommunications in Sweden
 Telephone numbers in Sweden
 Television in Sweden
 Digital terrestrial television in Sweden
 List of television stations in Sweden
 Television licensing in Sweden
 Internet in Sweden
 History of the Internet in Sweden
 Companies of Sweden
Currency of Sweden: Krona
ISO 4217: SEK
 Economic history of Sweden
 Energy in Sweden
 Biofuel in Sweden
 Electricity sector in Sweden
 Power stations in Sweden
 Nuclear power in Sweden
 Wind power in Sweden
 Offshore wind farms in Sweden
 Energy policy of Sweden
 Oil industry in Sweden
 Health in Sweden
 Health care in Sweden
 Obesity in Sweden
 Smoking in Sweden
 Suicide in Sweden
 Mining in Sweden
 Sweden Stock Exchange
 Tourism in Sweden
 Transport in Sweden
 Air transport in Sweden
 List of airlines of Sweden
 Airports in Sweden
 Automotive industry in Sweden
 Rail transport in Sweden
 Railway stations in Sweden
 High-speed rail in Sweden
 List of town tramway systems in Sweden
 Road system in Sweden
 Bridges in Sweden
 Roads in Sweden
 List of motorways in Sweden
 Road signs in Sweden
 Tunnels in Sweden
 Student loans in Sweden
 Unemployment benefits in Sweden
 Unemployment funds in Sweden
 Water supply and sanitation in Sweden
 Welfare in Sweden

Education in Sweden 

Education in Sweden
 Academic grading in Sweden
 Academic rank in Sweden
 Student loans in Sweden

See also 

Sweden
 Index of Sweden-related articles
 List of international rankings
 List of Sweden-related topics
 Member state of the European Union
 Member state of the United Nations
 Outline of Europe
 Outline of geography
 Royal Court of Sweden

References

External links 

Swedish Royal Court – Official website of the Swedish Royal House
VisitSweden.com – Official travel and tourism website for Sweden
SWEDEN.SE – The Official Gateway to Sweden
Radio Sweden   – Public service
The Swedish Government – Official site
The Swedish Parliament – Official site
Study in Sweden – Official guide to studying in Sweden
Statistiska Centralbyrån – Statistics Sweden (governmental)
Invest in Sweden Agency – Government agency
Swedish Trade Council
Sweden – Economic Growth and Structural Change, 1800-2000 — EH.Net Encyclopedia
The Local - Sweden's news in English – Independent English language news site
Anti-Jewish stereotypes in Swedish public discourse

Sweden
Outline